Banafsheh Deh may refer to:
 Banafsheh Deh, Chalus
 Banafsheh Deh, Nur